Rajeev Ram (born March 18, 1984) is an American professional tennis player who specializes in doubles.

Ram is a five-time major champion, having won the 2020 Australian Open, the 2021 US Open, and the 2022 US Open in men's doubles with Joe Salisbury, as well as Australian Open mixed doubles titles in 2019 and 2021 alongside Barbora Krejčíková. Ram also won a mixed doubles silver medal with Venus Williams at the 2016 Summer Olympics, and finished runner-up in men's doubles at the 2021 Australian Open, and in mixed doubles at the 2016 US Open. He reached his career-high doubles ranking of world No. 1 on 3 October 2022, and has won 23 doubles titles on the ATP Tour, including four at the Masters 1000 level. Ram has qualified for the ATP Finals on six occasions, winning the title in 2022, having finished as runner-up in both 2016 and 2021.

Prior to his retirement from singles in 2017, Ram reached a career-high ranking of world No. 56 in April 2016, and won two ATP singles titles, at the Hall of Fame Tennis Championships in both 2009 and 2015. He made his Davis Cup debut for the United States in 2021, and competed at the 2016 and 2020 Olympic Games.

Personal
Ram was born to Indian parents Raghav and Sushma Ram. Table tennis, cricket, and music are some of his interests. He is an Austin city parcheesi champion 4 years in a row 2010-2013.

Early career
In his junior career, Ram won a total of nine national junior titles, including singles and doubles. Amongst his titles were the National Claycourt 14-and-under singles title, the boys' 16-and-under national championship, the 18-and-under Easter Bowl title, and the Target Cup tournaments. In addition to his nine junior titles, Ram played high school tennis at Carmel, earned All-State honors, became the state singles champion, and earned a scholarship in both 1998 and 1999.

Rajeev earned a wildcard entry into the Juniors' 2001 US Open. Ram participated in all of the Grand Slam junior tournaments. He was the runner-up in juniors doubles at the 2002 Wimbledon, partnered with Brian Baker.

Ram then delayed enrollment at the University of Illinois at Urbana–Champaign until January 2003 so that he could continue to play tennis as an amateur on the pro circuit. During his one semester as a ringer at Illinois, he won the national doubles title with Brian Wilson and helped the Fighting Illini go undefeated (32–0) and win the 2003 NCAA team championship.

Professional years

2007-08
In 2007, he won five doubles Challenger titles partnering Bobby Reynolds, and reached three other finals on his way to a career-high doubles ranking of No. 62.

On July 5, 2008, Ram won the Nielsen USTA Pro Tennis Championship in Winnetka, Illinois for his first career Challenger-level singles title.

2009: First ATP singles and doubles titles
He won his first ATP doubles title in Chennai, India 2009 with compatriot Eric Butorac.

On July 10, 2009, Ram accomplished the unusual feat of winning four professional-level tennis matches in one day. At the Campbell's Hall of Fame Tennis Championships in Rhode Island, the tournament had been rained out early in the week, pushing back many scheduled matches. On July 10, Ram advanced to the singles semifinals with wins over Samuel Groth and Jesse Levine and then partnered with Jordan Kerr to advance to the doubles semifinals with wins over Arnaud Clément/Olivier Rochus and Nicolas Mahut/Fabrice Santoro. Mahut, Santoro, and Rochus each played three matches that day, though none of them won all their matches. Ram then beat Rochus and Sam Querrey on consecutive days to capture his first ATP title. He accomplished the rare feat of winning a title as a lucky loser and also captured the doubles title.

In Atlanta in July 2010, he won his first doubles title with American Scott Lipsky, defeating Rohan Bopanna and Kristof Vliegen for the outdoor hard-court Atlanta Tennis Championships. In the semifinals, Lipsky and Ram had defeated John Isner and James Blake. In November, they won a tournament in Eckental, Germany.

2011
Ram started 2011 strong, partnering with Lipsky in February to take the indoor hard court San Jose Open (over Christopher Kas from Germany and Alexander Peya from Austria) and the outdoor hard-court Delray Beach titles (over Alejandro Falla from Colombia and Xavier Malisse from Belgium). In June, he and Lipsky advanced to the quarterfinals at the 2011 French Open.

2013
In 2013, he teamed with Rohan Bopanna, and in Dubai, they reached the semifinals.

2014: First Grand Slam doubles semifinal
At the 2014 US Open (tennis) he reached his first Grand Slam semifinal partnering Scott Lipsky where they were defeated by top seeds and eventual champions, the Bryan brothers.

2015: Second ATP singles title
At the Hall of Fame Tennis Championships, he reached his second career final and won his second career ATP singles title by defeating Ivo Karlović.

2016: Olympic silver, first Grand Slam mixed doubles final, ATP Tour Finals runner-up
At the Delray Beach Open, Ram reached his third career final and first singles final outside the grass courts of the Hall of Fame Open, losing to Sam Querrey. At the Olympic Games, he won silver with Venus Williams in mixed doubles. Less than a month later, Ram and CoCo Vandeweghe advanced to the mixed doubles final at the US Open, where they were defeated in straight sets by Mate Pavić and Laura Siegemund. 

In men's doubles, Ram and partner Raven Klaasen reached the finals for the ATP World Tour Finals.

2017: Retirement in singles, First doubles Masters title at Indian Wells

2019: Australian Open mixed doubles title
Ram, with his partner Barbora Krejčíková won the Australian Open mixed doubles title.

2020: Australian Open doubles title, top 5 debut
Ram, with his partner Joe Salisbury won the Australian Open men's doubles tournament, defeating Max Purcell and Luke Saville in the final. As a result, he reached a career high of world No. 5 in doubles, on February 3, 2020.

2021: Second Australian Open mixed & US Open & Masters doubles titles, World No. 4
Ram and partner Barbora Krejčíková won Australian Open mixed doubles tournament, defeating Matthew Ebden and Samantha Stosur.
He also competed in the men's doubles tournament with partner Joe Salisbury to defend their title, but lost to Ivan Dodig and Filip Polášek in the final.

He reached the final and won his third Masters 1000 in Canada at the National Bank Open with Salisbury, defeating world No. 1 and No. 2 Croatians, Pavic and Mektic, his second final for the year at a Masters level after the Italian Open, where they lost to the Croatian pair. As a result, he returned to the top 5, on August 16, 2021.

At the 2021 US Open Ram, partnering with Salisbury, reached the final, defeating Matthew Ebden/Max Purcell in a nearly-three-hour-long match, saving four match points in the quarterfinals and Sam Querrey/Steve Johnson in the semifinals. The pair won the men’s doubles tournament, defeating Jamie Murray and Bruno Soares in the final. As a result, he reached a career high of world No. 4 in doubles, on September 20, 2021.

2022: US Open champion, Two Masters 1000 titles, World No. 1
He became World No. 2 on April 4, 2022 after reaching the quarterfinals at the 2022 Miami Open, losing to eventual champions Hubert Hurkacz and John Isner, with his partner Joe Salisbury who became World No. 1. He won the 2022 Monte-Carlo Masters with Salisbury defeating sixth-seeded pair of Robert Farah and Juan Sebastián Cabal. 

He won his second Masters of the season at the 2022 Western & Southern Open with Salisbury. At the 2022 US Open, Ram and Salisbury defended their title, defeating Wesley Koolhof and Neal Skupski in the finals. This was the third Grand Slam title together for Ram and Salisbury. They became just the second team to repeat as men's doubles champions at this Major in the Open era other than Todd Woodbridge and Mark Woodforde who went also back-to-back in New York. Ram became the oldest first-time World No. 1 in the doubles rankings on October 3, 2022. He is the 18th American to become No. 1 in the rankings.

World TeamTennis
Ram made his World TeamTennis debut in 2017 with the San Diego Aviators. He joined the Chicago Smash for its debut season, during the 2020 WTT season set to begin July 12.

Significant finals

Grand Slam finals

Doubles: 4 (3 titles, 1 runner-up)

Mixed doubles: 3 (2 titles, 1 runner-up)

Year-end championships finals

Doubles: 3 (1 title, 2 runner-ups)

Masters 1000 finals

Doubles: 7 (5 titles, 2 runner-ups)

Olympic medal matches

Mixed doubles: 1 (silver medal)

ATP career finals

Singles: 3 (2 titles, 1 runner-up)

Doubles: 46 (26 titles, 20 runner-ups)

Records
 These records were attained in the Open Era of tennis.

Performance timelines

Singles 

1 Held as Hamburg Masters (outdoor clay) until 2008, Madrid Masters (outdoor clay) 2009 – present.
2 Held as Madrid Masters (indoor hard) until 2008, and Shanghai Masters (outdoor hard) 2009 – present.

Doubles 
Current through the 2023 BNP Paribas Open

1 Held as Hamburg Masters (outdoor clay) until 2008, Madrid Masters (outdoor clay) 2009 – present.
2 Held as Madrid Masters (indoor hard) until 2008, and Shanghai Masters (outdoor hard) 2009 – present.

Mixed doubles
Current through the 2022 Australian Open.

References

External links
 
 
 Fighting Illini Men's Tennis Player Profile

1984 births
Living people
American male tennis players
Carmel High School (Indiana) alumni
Illinois Fighting Illini men's tennis players
People from Arapahoe County, Colorado
People from Carmel, Indiana
Tennis people from Colorado
Tennis people from Indiana
American sportspeople of Indian descent
Indian-American tennis players
American Hindus
Tennis players at the 2016 Summer Olympics
Olympic silver medalists for the United States in tennis
Medalists at the 2016 Summer Olympics
Olympic medalists in tennis
Australian Open (tennis) champions
US Open (tennis) champions
Grand Slam (tennis) champions in men's doubles
Grand Slam (tennis) champions in mixed doubles
Tennis players at the 2020 Summer Olympics
ATP number 1 ranked doubles tennis players